The 2008 Sabah state election was held on Saturday, 8 March 2008, simultaneously with the 12th general election of Malaysia. 60 state assembly seats were contested. The election was won by the Barisan Nasional (BN) coalition with a similar number of seats won as in the previous election, where they won 59 seats. One seat was won by Democratic Action Party (DAP). In the previous election, BN won 59 seats, while one seat was won by an independent candidate. Other parties contesting in this election are Democratic Action Party, Parti Keadilan Rakyat, BERSEKUTU, Pasok, Setia, and 47 independent candidates. The 25 parliamentary seats were also contested the same time. This is the second time the state election of Sabah is held simultaneously with the general (parliamentary) elections, the first time being in the 2004 general elections.

The State Legislative Assembly was dissolved on 13 February 2008, after state Chief Minister Musa Aman obtained consent from the Yang di-Pertua Negeri Tun Ahmadshah Abdullah. The nomination day was held on 24 February 2008. On this day, Ramlee Marbahan of BN won the seat of N.54 Bugaya unopposed. Barisan Nasional also won two parliamentary seats on nomination day.

On 27 February 2008, the PKR candidate Mohaspa Mohd Hassan pulled out of the election, thus awarding the N.41 Gum Gum seat to Zakaria Mohd Edris.

Summary of results

Parties representing Barisan Nasional
Allocation of seats among parties within the ruling BN coalition is as follows. This formula was used in the 2004 election and has been retained for this election.

Parliamentary seats

The parliamentary election was held simultaneously nationwide with the state elections of all Malaysian states except Sarawak. Barisan Nasional had won two seats unopposed on nomination day itself—the P.182 Pensiangan seat by Joseph Kurup, and P.191 Kalabakan by Ghapur Salleh. The following is a summary of results for parliamentary seats in Sabah:

References

2008
2008 elections in Malaysia